Kimberley East Railway Station was a station serving the town of Kimberley in Nottinghamshire, England.

History 
It was opened by the Great Northern Railway on its Derbyshire Extension in 1875-6

It was on the second summit on the climb through Watnall Tunnel from Basford and Bulwell of what was a hilly line, crossing as it did, several river valleys. Passenger services finished in 1964 and the line finally closed in 1968.

Following the trackbed of this line takes you to the Bennerley Viaduct. This is a grade II listed structure which is still in place on the Nottinghamshire Derbyshire border.

Kimberley's other station was on a line from  the Midland Railway's Erewash Valley Line to Nottingham.

Stationmasters

Samuel Packman ca. 1879
Thomas Hutchinson ca. 1891 - 1893
James Brook 1893 - 1908
George Charles Pike 1908 - 1932  
Joseph Mills Reddish 1932 - 1940
F.H. McArthur until 1944 (afterwards station master at Eastwood and Langley Mill)
Joseph George Watts 1944 - ca. 1950 (formerly station master at Daybrook)
H.H. Mather ca. 1953 (formerly station master at West Hallam)

Present day 
The line is now disused although it can still be traced and is used by walkers and horse riders from Kimberley as far as Hempshill Vale towards Nottingham where its trackbed has been used to accommodate Hempshill Hall Primary School.

The station buildings have been converted to residential accommodation. Part of the site of the station platforms is occupied by a car park and commercial workshop units. The former goods yard was occupied as a timber storage yard for many years but was subsequently redeveloped for housing. The rest of the station site and the trackbed towards Watnall (as far as the Newdigate Street road bridge where the cutting has been filled) has been preserved as a nature reserve.

Further reading

References

See also 
 Kimberley West railway station
 Watnall railway station

Disused railway stations in Nottinghamshire
Railway stations in Great Britain opened in 1876
Railway stations in Great Britain closed in 1964
Former Great Northern Railway stations
Beeching closures in England
Borough of Broxtowe